Halloween III: Season of the Witch is a soundtrack by John Carpenter & Alan Howarth for the film of the same name. It was released in 1982 on vinyl through MCA Records and on CD through Varèse Sarabande. An expanded 25th Anniversary Edition was released in 2007 through Alan Howarth Incorporated. It was the final Halloween soundtrack to be produced by Carpenter, who would eventually return to the franchise to score 2018's Halloween.

Track listing

Personnel
 John Carpenter – composition, performance
 Alan Howarth - composition, performance, synthesizer programming, sequencing, editing, recording, production
 Tommy Lee Wallace - announcer on "Halloween Montage"

References

John Carpenter soundtracks
1982 soundtrack albums
Horror film soundtracks
Film scores
MCA Records soundtracks
Varèse Sarabande soundtracks
Halloween (franchise) soundtracks
Halloween albums